Clevelode is a small village in Worcestershire, England. It is located around 5 miles south of Worcester just to the west of the River Severn. Clevelode is next to the B4244 between Callow End and Hanley Castle in the civil parish of Powick. A caravan park and bed and breakfast are located just south of Clevelode.

References

Villages in Worcestershire